Hepsi 2 is the second album of the Turkish girl band Hepsi. The album was released in June 2006. They have shot two music videos from this album, which are Kalpsizsin and Aşk Sakızı.

Track listing

References

2006 albums
Hepsi albums